Experience is the process through which conscious organisms perceive the world around them.

Experience may also refer to:

Arts and entertainment

Music
 The Jimi Hendrix Experience (1966–69), a rock band, led by guitarist Jimi Hendrix, sometimes known as "The Experience".
 Experience (Jimi Hendrix album) (1971)
 Experience (Lincoln Thompson album) (1979)
 Experience (The Prodigy album) (1992)
 Experience (Jodie Christian album) (1992)
 The Experience (Yolanda Adams album), 2001
 Experience: Jill Scott 826+ (2001), a live double album by American R&B-soul singer–songwriter Jill Scott 
 Experience (York album) (2001), by German electronic act York
 Experience (2001), by DJ Project
 Experience (World Saxophone Quartet album) (2004)
 The Experience (gospel concert), a gospel music concert in Nigeria
Experience (Rize album) (2010)
 "Experience" (Diana Ross song), 1985
 Experience (Victoria Monét, Khalid and SG Lewis song)
 "Experience", a song by Gentle Giant on their 1973 album In a Glass House

Other
 "Experience" (essay), an 1844 essay by Ralph Waldo Emerson
 Experience (book), a 2000 book of memoirs by Martin Amis
 Experience (1921 film), a lost drama film starring Leslie Banks
 The Experience (film), a 1973 Iranian short feature film directed by Abbas Kiarostami
 Michael Jackson: The Experience, a 2010 music video game based on Michael Jackson's music
 Experience points in role playing games
 "Experiences", the official name for Roblox games
 Experience, a magazine published by Northeastern University

People
 Experience Estabrook (1813–1894), an American attorney and legal administrator
 Experience Mayhew (1673–1758), a New England missionary
 The Experience (professional wrestling), a wrestling tag team

Other uses
 Conscious experience, see Consciousness
 Customer experience, a marketing concept
 User experience, reactions to using a particular product, system or service

See also

 Experienced (album), a 2011 live CD and DVD by Boom Boom Satellites
 Experiences (album), an album by  X Marks the Pedwalk
 Process philosophy
 Thee Experience, a Hollywood night club in 1969
 X-Perience, a German Eurodance group